The Kruostas is a river of  Kėdainiai district municipality, Kaunas County, central Lithuania. It originates near Alksnėnai village and goes through agriculture fields passing Žilvičiai, Šlapaberžė, Beržai, Daškoniai. The lower course goes through a deep valley beside Vaidatoniai hillfort. This area is Kruostas botanic sanctuary. The river meets the Nevėžis from the right side near Urbeliai village. Vaidatoniai pond is on the Kruostas river.

The name Kruostas derives from Lithuanian word kruostas or skruostas ('cheek, eyelash, eyebrow'), further from skrosti, skersti ('to slice, to butcher').

References

Rivers of Lithuania
Kėdainiai District Municipality